Companhia Paulista de Trens Metropolitanos (CPTM) is a rapid transit and commuter rail company owned by the São Paulo State Department for Metropolitan Transports. It was created on May 28, 1992, from several railroads that already existed in Greater São Paulo, Brazil.

The system carries about 2 million passengers a day. On December 7, 2018, CPTM set a weekday ridership record with 3,221,035 trips.

History
Most of railways now run by CPTM were built between 1860 and 1957 by the São Paulo Railway (lines 7 and 10), Estrada de Ferro Sorocabana (lines 8 and 9) and Estrada de Ferro Central do Brasil (lines 11 and 12). These railways were eventually incorporated into the state-owned Rede Ferroviária Federal (RFFSA) in 1957 and Ferrovia Paulista S.A. (FEPASA) 1971. Finally, in 1992 the urban sections of RFFSA and FEPASA merged, forming CPTM.

Between the end of the 1990s and the early 2000s, CPTM began the conversion of some metropolitan lines to provide a service similar to rapid transit and better integrate with the São Paulo Metro. Most of the stations where either rebuilt or modernized and new trains were purchased allowing the headway of lines to be as low as four minutes in some lines. This experience started in Line E in the year 2000, in the stretch known as "East Express", serving the east end of São Paulo City and running parallel to Line 3 - Red.

The proposed Trens Intercidades regional railway project is considering using Line 7 tracks for providing service to neighboring cities of Jundiaí, Campinas and Americana.

In 2018, CPTM opened Line 13, the first line completely built and operated by the company. This line connects Line 12 to the São Paulo–Guarulhos International Airport, with a special Express service connecting it to the central Luz station, and another service connecting it to the Brás station, both only operating on a specific schedule.

Operation
CPTM operates five lines in the Greater São Paulo area, identified by number and color. Most of these lines run on existing surface tracks that continue out of Greater São Paulo as MRS Logística intercity freight lines and share right of way with freight trains. The more lightly used outer sections of several lines have level crossings.

Service starts every day at 4 AM, when trains depart from each terminus, until the last train leaves at midnight. On Saturdays operation is extended until 1 AM.

The company charges a flat fare that can be paid either by magnetic ticket sold in the stations or with a rechargeable smartcard, and grants access to any of the rail lines on the Greater São Paulo, including lines operated by the São Paulo Metro.

Lines

Expansion

Express services

Gallery

See also
São Paulo Metro
List of suburban and commuter rail systems
Transport in São Paulo
Bike station

References

External links

 Official page of the CPTM
 Secretaria dos Transportes Metropolitanos

 
Railway companies of Brazil
Electric railways in Brazil
5 ft 3 in gauge railways in Brazil
Government-owned companies of Brazil
Companies based in São Paulo